The 1924 Copa Ibarguren was the 12th edition of this National cup of Argentina. It was played by the champions of both leagues, Primera División and Liga Rosarina de Football crowned during 1924.

Boca Juniors (Primera División champion) faced Club Atlético Belgrano (champion of Copa Nicasio Vila organised by Liga Rosarina) at Sportivo Barracas Stadium. Although they had won their league titles in 1924, the final was played two years after, on 13 May 1926.

Belgrano had won the Copa Vila (the top football competition in Rosario). As three teams (Belgrano, Rosario Central and Tiro Federal) shared the first position at the end of the tournament, the LRF established a playoff to decide a champion. Belgrano defeated Rosario Central in the semifinal and Tiro Federal in the final, played on 23 November 1924 (1–0 in both cases) and was crowned champion. It was also the only Rosarian major title won by C.A. Belgrano.

Qualified teams 

Note

Match details

References

i
1924 in Argentine football
1924 in South American football